This is a list of notable food pastes. A food paste is a semi-liquid colloidal suspension, emulsion, or aggregation used in food preparation or eaten directly as a spread. Pastes are often spicy or aromatic, prepared well in advance of actual usage, and are often made into a preserve for future use. Common pastes are curry pastes, fish pastes, some fruit preserves, legume pastes and nut pastes. Purées, however, are food pastes made from already cooked ingredients, as in the case of cauliflower purée, or raw, as in the case of apple purée.

Food pastes

Fish and seafood

 Fish paste – prepared from fish parts through fermentation
 Anchovy paste
 Gentleman's Relish
 Muria – concentrated garum (fermented fish sauce) evaporated down to a thick paste with salt crystals was called muria; it would have been rich in protein, amino acids, minerals and B vitamins.
 
 
 
 
 Shrimp paste – made from fermented ground shrimp, either from fresh shrimp or dried ones, with the addition of salt.  Prepared shrimp paste often has oil, sugar, garlic, chili, and other spices added.
 Saeu-jeot
 Surimi – refers to a paste made from fish or other meat and also refers to a number of Asian foods that use surimi as their primary ingredients
 Kamaboko

Fruit and vegetable

 Àmàlà – a Nigerian specialty paste made using yams, it is thick and brown
 Baba ghanoush – an eggplant (aubergine) based paste
 Date paste – used as a pastry filling
 Funge de bombo – a manioc paste used in northern Angola, and elsewhere in Africa
 Guava paste
  Hilbet – a paste made in Ethiopia and Eritrea from legumes, mainly lentils or faba beans, with garlic, ginger and spices
 Hummus – made from chickpeas with the addition of tahini, olive oil, lemon juice, salt and garlic
 Moretum
 Pesto
 Quince cheese
 Ssamjang – a Korean sesame- and bean-based paste used as a sauce on meat
 Tapenade – made from olives ground with anchovies or capers, spices and olive oil
 Tomato paste – made from boiling tomatoes until they form a thick paste which is stored for later use in soups, sauces and stews

Grain
 Farina
 Millet paste – consumed by the Fula people in the Sahel and West Africa, it is a main ingredient in nyiiri, a common Fula dish that is prepared using millet paste and a thick sauce
 Pamonha – a traditional Brazilian paste made from fresh corn and milk
 Polenta
 Mealy pop or bogobe – prepared from ground grain, usually maize or millet, and often fermented before cooking

Instant soup

 Erbswurst

Legume

 
 
 
 
  – made from ground soybeans which are then fermented

Meat

 Chopped liver
 Pâté – finely chopped, finely ground or pureed highly seasoned meat, prepared using beef, pork, liver, or animal organs
 Pheasant paste
 Potted meat food product

Nut and seed

 
 
  
 
 Marzipan – made from almonds, with the addition of sugar and sometimes egg whites, it is used as a filling for confections, or hardened to serve as is
 Peanut butter
 Peanut paste – a product of peanuts and is used as an ingredient in sauces, baked goods and breakfast cereals, among others
 Plumpy'nut
 Satsivi – a Georgian specialty made from walnuts, it is used unsweetened as a bread dip, or sweetened as a filling in a baklava-like pastry
 Sunflower butter
 Tahini – made from ground sesame seeds

Spices and herbs

Herbs

 Kroeung

Spicy

Sweet
 Cookie butter
 Fondant – a basic sugar paste used as an intermediary in the production of candies and icings

Yeast extracts

Yeast extracts, usually as byproduct from brewing beer, are made into food pastes, usually dark-brown in color.

See also

 Huff paste
 List of condiments
 List of dips
 List of spreads
 Mortar and pestle – a kitchen device used since ancient times to prepare ingredients or substances by crushing and grinding them into a fine paste or powder
 Wet grinder – a food preparation appliance used especially in Indian cuisine for grinding food grains to produce a paste or batter

References

External links
 * 
 
 

Paste, Food